NGC 6139 is a globular cluster of the Milky Way in the constellation Scorpius.

Visibility
The cluster appears visibly small and requires larger +12" aperture telescopes to view the core. Appearing around 1.5 arcmins having a radius of .75 arcmins, despite its rather bright magnitude.

Visibility

References

External links
 

Globular clusters
Scorpius (constellation)
6139